Bohova is a village in Tran Municipality in western Bulgaria. It is located at the southwestern edge of the Znepole valley. Bohova is located about two kilometers from the border with Serbia.

Villages in Pernik Province